Ancyrospora is a fossil plant genus.

The genus was described in 1960 by J.B. Richardson.

References

Prehistoric plant genera
Silurian plants
Devonian plants
Carboniferous plants
Triassic plants